is a Japanese visual novel developed and released by Cave on November 11, 2011. The gameplay in Instant Brain follows a plot-line which offers pre-determined scenarios with courses of interaction.

As a bonus the game includes Cave's vertical shooter DoDonPachi with Kinect support, and a new version of Nin²-Jump titled Nin²-Brain.

Gameplay
Much of the gameplay requires little interaction from the player as the majority of the time is spent reading the text that appears on the game's screen. The text being displayed represents the thoughts of the characters or the dialogue between them. The player is occasionally presented with choices to determine the direction of the game. Depending on what is chosen, the plot may progress in a specific direction.

Story
The story is set in a futuristic world, virtual Japan, around 30–40 years and revolves around the showbiz in the future. The player play as lead character, Zenya Harataki, who has lost all memory of his life prior to six years ago.

Hataraki somehow gets involved in a conspiracy that is connected to his lost memories, and a dark incident from the past centred in the showbiz. To progress through the game, the player use his camera — dubbed the “Exporger” – and take pictures that allows him to get scoops before other reporters, as well as finding clues to his past.

Character
 Zenya Barataki
 Android C
 Kirin Yatsuhisha
 Kuroe Jakou (Voiced by Miyuki Sawashiro)
 Mikuri Kinshoku
 Fuuka Oujou

Development

Reception
On release, Famitsu gave Instant Brain a score of 32 out of 40.

References

External links
 

2011 video games
Bishōjo games
Japan-exclusive video games
Video games developed in Japan
Video games scored by Ryu Umemoto
Video games scored by Yuji Takenouchi
Visual novels
Xbox 360 games
Xbox 360-only games
Single-player video games